Mill Creek rises in Montgomery County, Pennsylvania; runs southeasterly to West Philadelphia, where it enters 19th-century sewer pipes; and debouches roughly five miles later in the Schuylkill River near The Woodlands Cemetery. It starts near Narbeth, where its source is buried, then runs free for a mile or so before entering Philadelphia at the Overbrook station.

Development 

The creek, called Nanganesey by the Lenape Indians in their patent to white settlers, was renamed Quarn Creek by the Swedish settlers. It later took the names Monson's Great Mill Fall, Mill Creek, and Little Mill Creek after the factories it powered at Grays Ferry.

Originally, Mill Creek was fast-flowing (10 miles per hour) and could discharge 300,000 cubic feet per minute into the Schuylkill. It was known to flood, destroying crops and creating seas of mud.

In 1834, merchant and banker John Buckman built a 90-foot dam across Mill Creek just south of Market Street at current-day 46th Street. The dam diverted some of the water into a 12-foot-wide mill race that ran parallel to the creek for about 1,100 feet and into a 30-by-60-foot "forebay." The water flowed under Market Street and over waterwheels that powered Buckman's mill.

As urban development began in West Philadelphia, the city covered several stream beds with cisterns and a layer of fill deep enough to level the land so that it could be platted into a regular street grid.

In 1866, a land survey determined that Mill Creek should be drained. The covering of Mill Creek began in 1869, encapsulating the watercourse in a -diameter drainpipe said to be the largest sewer pipe in the world at the time. By 1872, the creek was buried south to Baltimore Avenue. Its burial was completed around 1895, allowing the grid of rowhouse development to continue toward the city's western edge at Cobbs Creek.

Natural erosion, abetted by spotty maintenance of the cistern, has caused occasional collapses of the buildings above. In the 1930s, several homes collapsed on Walnut Street between 43rd and 44th Streets after the creek undermined them. There have been road collapses on 43rd Street, south of Walnut. In 1955, the block of Sansom Street between 43rd and 44th Streets collapsed and was condemned. The creek undermines the roadbed where the Route 34 and Route 13 trolleys cross 43rd Street.

A prominent feature of Clark Park is its "bowl," once a mill pond fed by the creek.

Montgomery County has begun an effort to restore the creek's watershed through its Mill Creek Stream Restoration.

Further reading 
  - for a discussion of the suppression of Mill Creek in Philadelphia and efforts to recognize the lost stream

See also 

 List of rivers of Pennsylvania

External links

 
 
 
Three 1924 photos from Gray's Ferry Bridge north to the outlet of Mill Creek and The Woodlands:

References

Rivers of Philadelphia
Rivers of Pennsylvania
Tributaries of the Schuylkill River
Subterranean rivers of the United States